Darkest Night may refer to:

Film and television
 Darkest Night (film)
 "Darkest Night", an episode of the fan film series Star Trek: Hidden Frontier (Episode 3, Season 5)

Literature 
 Darkest Night,  a 2017 novel Warriors: A Vision of Shadows series by Erin Hunter

Podcasts 
 Darkest Night (podcast)

Music
 "Darkest Night", a song on the 1995 album The Biz by The Sea and Cake
 "Darkest Night", a song on the 2001 album Green Room Blues by Deluxtone Rockets
 "Darkest Night", a song on the 2003 album Nazarene Crying Towel by Lost Dogs
 "Darkest Night", a song on the 2005 album Shadows Are Security by As I Lay Dying
 "Darkest Night", a heavily sampled song by French band Lafayette Afro Rock Band

See also
 Darkest Knight, a 1996 Star Wars novel by Kevin J. Anderson
 Dark Knight (disambiguation)
 Black Knight (disambiguation)
 Dark Night (disambiguation)
 Blackest Knight
 Blackest Night
 Black Night
 Night